Lonely Is an Eyesore is a compilation on the 4AD label. Released in June 1987, it features artists who were signed to the label at that time. All tracks were recorded during the period immediately preceding the release (1985-1987), with the exception of "Frontier" by Dead Can Dance, which was a demo by the group from 1979. The title of the release comes from the lyric of the track "Fish" by Throwing Muses, at that time the newest signing to the label.

The original release was available on LP, CD, and cassette. A companion music video was released as well. A limited edition wooden box edition contained all three audio formats, the video, and etchings.

Track listing
 Colourbox - "Hot Doggie" (2:57)
 This Mortal Coil - "Acid, Bitter and Sad" (5:26)
 The Wolfgang Press - "Cut the Tree" (5:35)
 Throwing Muses - "Fish" (4:28)
 Dead Can Dance - "Frontier" (2:58)
 Cocteau Twins - "Crushed" (3:16)
 Dif Juz - "No Motion" (4:49)
 Clan of Xymox - "Muscoviet Musquito" (4:03)
 Dead Can Dance - "The Protagonist" (8:47)

References 

1987 compilation albums
4AD compilation albums
Record label compilation albums
1987 video albums
Rock compilation albums
Rock video albums
Music video compilation albums
4AD video albums
Albums produced by Ivo Watts-Russell